In geology, a blowhole or marine geyser is formed as sea caves grow landwards and upwards into vertical shafts and expose themselves towards the surface, which can result in hydraulic compression of sea water that is released through a port from the top of the blowhole. The geometry of the cave and blowhole along with tide levels and swell conditions determine the height of the spray.

Mechanics 

Blowholes are likely to occur in areas where there are crevices, such as lava tubes, in rock along the coast. These areas are often located along fault lines and on islands. As powerful waves hit the coast, water rushes into these crevices and bursts out in a high pressured release. It is often accompanied by a loud noise and wide spray, and for this reason, blowholes are often sites of tourism.

Marine erosion on rocky coastlines produce blowholes that are found throughout the world.  They are found at intersecting faults and on the windward sides of a coastline where they receive higher wave energy from the open ocean.  The development of a blowhole is linked to the formation of a littoral cave.  These two elements make up the blowhole system.  A blowhole system always contains three main features: a catchment entrance, a compression cavern and an expelling port.  The arrangement, angle and size of these three features determine the force of the air to water ratio that is ejected from the port.  The blowhole feature tends to occur in the most distal section of a littoral cave.  As their name suggests, blowholes have the ability to move air rapidly. Strong reverse draughts in response to pressure changes in a connecting littoral cave can send wind speeds upwards of 70 km/h.

The formation of a blowhole system begins as a littoral cave is formed.  The main factors that contribute to littoral caves formation are wave dynamics and the parent material’s rock property.  A parent material property such as susceptibility or resistance to weathering plays a major role in the development of caves.  Littoral caves can be formed by one of two processes: caves made of limestone are produced by karst (dissolution) processes, and caves made of igneous rock are produced by pseudokarst (non-dissolutional) processes.  In time the littoral cave enlarges growing inland and vertically through weak joints in the parent material.  As weathering continues the roof of the cave is exposed, and the blowhole continues to enlarge, eventually the roof of the littoral cave is weaken and collapses. This creates a steep-wall inlet that allows the next stage of coastal morphology to progress. 

La Bufadora is a large example of a blowhole located in the Punta Banda Peninsula of Baja California, Mexico.  It consists of a littoral cave with a thin opening that has a recurrence eruption interval of 13 -17 seconds, ejecting water up to 100 ft. above sea level.

Ecological impacts 

Blowholes have the capacity to change the topography near their locations. Blowholes can eventually erode the area surrounding the crevices to form larger sea caves. In some instances, the cave itself may collapse. This event may create shallow pools along the coast.

Other 

A blowhole is also the name of a rare geologic feature in which air is blown through a small hole at the surface due to pressure differences between a closed underground system and the surface. The blowholes of Wupatki National Monument are an example of such a phenomenon. It is estimated that the closed underground passages have a volume of at least seven billion cubic feet. Wind speeds can approach 30 miles per hour. Another well-known example of this kind of blowhole is the natural entrance to Wind Cave in South Dakota.

Images

See also
Geo (landform)

References

 
Cave geology
Coastal geography
Coastal and oceanic landforms